Salvador "Sal" Sánchez Narváez (January 26, 1959 – August 12, 1982) was a Mexican professional boxer born in the town of Santiago Tianguistenco, Estado de México. Sanchez was the WBC and [[The Ring (magazine)|The Ring]] featherweight champion from  1980 to 1982.  Many of his contemporaries as well as boxing writers believe that had it not been for his premature death, Sánchez could have gone on to become the greatest featherweight boxer of all time. Sánchez died on August 12, 1982 in a car accident from Querétaro to San Luis Potosí. He is also the uncle of Salvador Sánchez II.

In 1991, Sánchez was inducted into the International Boxing Hall of Fame. The Ring magazine named both him, and Sugar Ray Leonard, as Fighter of the Year in 1981. In 2002, he was named the 24th greatest fighter of the past 80 years by The Ring magazine. In 2003, The Ring rated Sánchez number 88 on the list of 100 greatest punchers of all time. Sánchez was voted as the #3 featherweight of the 20th century by the Associated Press.

Early life
Sánchez was born to father Felipe Sánchez and to mother María Luisa Narváez.

Professional career
Sánchez started his professional career at the age of 16, as a teenager (after a brief amateur career consisting of reportedly 4 amateur bouts) he started piling up wins against tough Mexican opposition. His first fight of note came in his 19th professional fight against the Mexican bantamweight champion Antonio Becerra. Becerra proved too experienced for the young Sánchez, the bout ended in a split decision defeat for Sánchez.

Sánchez kept on fighting and moved to the Featherweight division. Soon he had beaten people like the Puerto Rican featherweight champion Felix Trinidad Sr., on his way to securing a title shot at world champion Danny "Little Red" Lopez, a popular TV fighter of the late 1970s who was an impressive fighter and had won some spectacular fights against the likes of former world champion David Kotei (twice), Juan Malvares and Mike Ayala. Confident and hard to beat, Lopez was beaten by the 21-year-old Sánchez, who knocked out the defending champion in 13 rounds in Phoenix, Arizona, United States on February 2, 1980. Sánchez defended his title for the first time with a 15-round unanimous decision against Ruben Castillo (47–1). Thinking it was just a case of 'beginner's luck' (as it was Sánchez's first world title fight ever), Lopez looked for a rematch and this he got, in Las Vegas. This time Sánchez defeated Lopez by 14th-round TKO. In his next fight, he defeated Patrick Ford (15–0) .

On December 13, 1980, Sánchez defeated future champion Juan Laporte by unanimous decision. Sánchez then defended his title against Roberto Castanon (43–1–0) and scored a win over Nicky Perez (50–3–0). Then undefeated World Jr Featherweight champion Wilfredo Gómez (32–0–1) went up in weight and challenged Sánchez. Sánchez retained the crown by a knockout in round eight on August 21, 1981, in Las Vegas, and Gómez had to return to the Jr. Featherweight division.

With that victory, Salvador was an unknown to the casual boxing fan no more. He became a household name all over the United States that night.

In his next fight, he defeated Olympic medalist Pat Cowdell by split decision. His defense vs unheralded Jorge "Rocky" Garcia was the second fight featuring two featherweights ever to be televised by HBO, the first having been his contest with Cowdell. He beat Garcia punch after punch, but the challenger gave honor to his nickname, an unknown fighter who lasts the distance with the world champion.

On July 21, 1982, Sánchez faced future champion Azumah Nelson at Madison Square Garden. Nelson, a late substitute for mandatory challenger Mario Miranda, was unknown at the time however, and was expected to only go a few rounds with the champ. It was an intense battle, with Sánchez managing to drop his young charge in the 7th round. After that they engaged in violent exchange after violent exchange. In the 15th, Sánchez broke out finally, connecting with a serious combination that dropped the challenger almost outside the ring. Referee Tony Perez had to stop the fight seconds later. Azumah Nelson went on to have a glittering career and was inducted into the International Boxing Hall of Fame in 2004.

Sánchez proved a dominant featherweight champion.  He held title defense victories over the next three fighters (LaPorte, Gomez, and Nelson) who won the WBC title after his death. He went 4-0, all by knockout, against fellow members of the International Boxing Hall of Fame (Danny Lopez twice-KO 13, KO 14-Wilfredo Gomez-KO 8-and Azumah Nelson-KO 15) and defeated four future or former world champions (Lopez, Gomez, LaPorte and Nelson).

Death
Three weeks after his victory over Nelson, as he was training for a rematch with Laporte set for September, Sanchez crashed on the early morning of August 12, 1982, while driving his Porsche 928 sports car along the federal highway from Querétaro to San Luis Potosí, dying instantly. At the time of his death, there were talks about a bout with Colombian Mario Miranda, a rematch with Gómez or a challenge of world lightweight champion Alexis Argüello. The latter was already off the table. There had been negotiations between the Sánchez and Argüello camps but they broke off when Argüello chose to campaign as a junior welterweight.
Salvador Sánchez finished his career 44-1-1.
Sánchez was posthumously inducted into the International Boxing Hall of Fame in 1991.

Acting
Sánchez appeared as himself, albeit as a Junior Lightweight world champion, in the 1983 film The Last Fight, released after his death. The movie was dedicated to him. In it, Sánchez shared scenes with Ruben Blades, who played a challenger to Sánchez's title.

Professional boxing record

{|class="wikitable" style="text-align:center
|-
!No
!Result
!Record
!Opponent
!Type
!Round, time
!Date
!Location
!Notes
|-align=center
|46
|Win 
| 44–1–1 
|align=left| Azumah Nelson
|TKO
|15 (15),  
|Jul 21, 1982
|align=left| 
|align=left|
|-align=center
|45
|Win 
| 43–1–1 
|align=left| Jorge Garcia
|UD
|15
|May 8, 1982
|align=left| 
|align=left|
|-align=center
|44
|Win 
| 42–1–1
|align=left| Pat Cowdell
|SD
|15
|Dec 12, 1981
|align=left| 
|align=left|
|-align=center
|43
|Win 
| 41–1–1 
|align=left| Wilfredo Gómez
|TKO
|8 (15), 
|Aug 21, 1981
|align=left| 
|align=left|
|-align=center
|42
|Win 
| 40–1–1 
|align=left| Nicky Perez
|UD
|10
|Jul 11, 1981
|align=left| 
|align=left|
|-align=center
|41
|Win 
| 39–1–1 
|align=left| Roberto Castañón
|TKO
|10 (15),  
|Mar 22, 1981 
|align=left| 
|align=left|
|-align=center
|40
|Win 
| 38–1–1 
|align=left| Juan Laporte
|UD
|15
|Dec 13, 1980 
|align=left| 
|align=left|
|-align=center
|39
|Win
|37–1–1
|align=left| Patrick Ford 
|MD
|15
|Sep 13, 1980
|align=left| 
|align=left|
|-align=center
|38
|Win 
| 36–1–1 
|align=left| Danny Lopez
|TKO
|14 (15),  
|Jun 21, 1980
|align=left| 
|align=left|
|-align=center
|37
|Win 
| 35–1–1 
|align=left| Ruben Castillo
|UD
|15
|Apr 12, 1980
|align=left| 
|align=left|
|-align=center
|36
|Win 
| 34–1–1 
|align=left| Danny Lopez
|TKO
|13 (15),  
|Feb 2, 1980
|align=left| 
|align=left|
|-align=center
|35
|Win 
| 33–1–1 
|align=left| Rafael Gandarilla
|TKO
|5 (10)
|Dec 15, 1979
|align=left| 
|align=left|
|-align=center
|34
|Win 
| 32–1–1 
|align=left| Richard Rozelle
|KO
|3 (10),  
|Sep 15, 1979
|align=left| 
|align=left|
|-align=center
|33
|Win 
| 31–1–1 
|align=left| Félix Trinidad Sr.
|TKO
|5 (10)
|Aug 7, 1979
|align=left| 
|align=left|
|-align=center
|32
|Win 
| 30–1–1 
|align=left| Rosalio Muro
|KO
|3 (10)
|Jul 22, 1979 
|align=left| 
|align=left|
|-align=center
|31
|Win 
| 29–1–1 
|align=left| Fel Clemente
|UD
|12
|Jun 17, 1979
|align=left| 
|align=left|
|-align=center
|30
|Win 
| 28–1–1 
|align=left| Salvador Torres
|TKO
|7 (10)
|May 19, 1979
|align=left| 
|align=left|
|-align=center
|29
|Win 
| 27–1–1 
|align=left| James Martinez
|UD
|10
|Mar 13, 1979
|align=left| 
|align=left|
|-align=center
|28
|Win 
| 26–1–1 
|align=left| Carlos Mimila
|KO
|3 (10)
|Feb 3, 1979
|align=left| 
|align=left|
|-align=center
|27
|Win 
| 25–1–1 
|align=left| José Santana
|TKO
|2 (10)
|Dec 16, 1978
|align=left| 
|align=left|
|-align=center
|26
|Win 
| 24–1–1 
|align=left| Edwin Alarcon
|TKO
|9 (10)
|Nov 21, 1978
|align=left| 
|align=left|
|-align=center
|25
|Win 
| 23–1–1 
|align=left| Francisco Ponce
|KO
|2 (10)
|Sep 26, 1978
|align=left| 
|align=left|
|-align=center
|24
|Win 
| 22–1–1 
|align=left| Hector Cortez
|TKO 
|7 (10)
|Aug 13, 1978 
|align=left| 
|align=left|
|-align=center
|23
|Win 
| 21–1–1 
|align=left| José Sánchez
|UD
|10
|Jul 1, 1978
|align=left| 
|align=left|
|-align=center
|22
|Draw 
| 20–1–1 
|align=left| Juan Escobar
|MD
|10
|Mar 15, 1978
|align=left| 
|align=left|
|-align=center
|21
|Win 
| 20–1 
|align=left| Eliseo Cosme
|PTS
|10
|Dec 5, 1977
|align=left| 
|align=left|
|-align=center
|20
|Win 
| 19–1 
|align=left| José Luis Soto
|PTS
|10
|Nov 11, 1977 
|align=left| 
|align=left|
|-align=center
|19
|Loss 
| 18–1 
|align=left| Antonio Becerra
|SD 
|12
|Sep 9, 1977 
|align=left| 
|align=left|
|-align=center
|18
|Win 
| 18–0 
|align=left| Rosalio Badillo
|TKO
|5 (10)
|May 21, 1977 
|align=left| 
|align=left|
|-align=center
|17
|Win 
| 17–0 
|align=left| Daniel Felizardo
|KO
|5 (10)
|Mar 12, 1977 
|align=left| 
|align=left|
|-align=center
|16
|Win 
| 16–0 
|align=left| Raúl López
|TKO
|10 (10)
|Feb 5, 1977 
|align=left| 
|align=left|
|-align=center
|15
|Win 
| 15–0 
|align=left| Antonio Leon
|TKO 
|10 (10)
|Dec 25, 1976 
|align=left| 
|align=left|
|-align=center
|14
|Win 
| 14–0 
|align=left| Saul Montana
|TKO
|9 (10)
|Oct 31, 1976 
|align=left| 
|align=left|
|-align=center
|13
|Win 
| 13–0 
|align=left| Joel Valdez
|TKO
|9 (10)
|Aug 11, 1976
|align=left| 
|align=left|
|-align=center
|12
|Win 
| 12–0 
|align=left| Pedro Sandoval
|TKO
|9 (10)
|Jul 5, 1976
|align=left| 
|align=left|
|-align=center
|11
|Win 
| 11–0 
|align=left| Fidel Trejo
|KO
|6 (10) 
|May 26, 1976 
|align=left| 
|align=left|
|-align=center
|10
|Win 
| 10–0 
|align=left| Jose Chavez
|TKO
|7 (10)
|Apr 24, 1976
|align=left| 
|align=left|
|-align=center
|9
|Win 
| 9–0 
|align=left| Serafin Isidro Pacheco	
|TKO
|4 (8)
|Mar 31, 1976 
|align=left| 
|align=left|
|-align=center
|8
|Win 
| 8–0 
|align=left| Javier Solis
|TKO 
|7 (8)
|Feb 25, 1976
|align=left| 
|align=left|
|-align=center
|7
|Win 
| 7–0 
|align=left| Juan Granados
|TKO 
|3 (8)
|Jan 24, 1976
|align=left| 
|align=left|
|-align=center
|6
|Win 
| 6–0 
|align=left| Fidel Trejo
|UD
|8
|Dec 11, 1975
|align=left| 
|align=left|
|-align=center
|5
|Win 
| 5–0 
|align=left| Candido Sandoval	
|TKO
|7 (8) 
|Nov 25, 1975
|align=left| 
|align=left|
|-align=center
|4
|Win 
| 4–0 
|align=left| Cesar Lopez
|KO
|4 (6)
|Oct 19, 1975
|align=left| 
|align=left|
|-align=center
|3
|Win 
|3–0 
|align=left| Victor Martinez
|KO
|2 (6)
|Aug 10, 1975
| align=left| 
|align=left|
|-align=center
|2
|Win 
| 2–0 
|align=left| Miguel Ortiz
|KO
|3 (4)
|May 25, 1975
|align=left| 
|align=left|
|-align=center
|1
|Win 
| 1–0 
|align=left| Al Gardeno
|KO
|3 (4)
|May 4, 1975
|align=left| 
|align=left|
|-align=center

Trivia
In the movie 21, Ben Campbell, played by Jim Sturgess, introduces himself to a girl as Salvador Sánchez.

Folk Rock band Sun Kil Moon recorded an eponymous song about Sanchez on their 2003 album Ghosts of the Great Highway''.

See also
 Notable boxing families
 List of Mexican boxing world champions
 List of WBC world champions
 Salvador Sanchez vs. Juan Laporte
 Salvador Sánchez vs. Wilfredo Gómez

References

External links
Salvador Sánchez page at the International Boxing Hall of Fame
Salvador Sánchez on the Ring Magazine Cover – November 1981 Issue
The Legend of Salvador Sanchez – Fight Fanatics
Seconds Out Article

|- 

1959 births
1982 deaths
Mexican male boxers
Featherweight boxers
International Boxing Hall of Fame inductees
Boxers from the State of Mexico
World Boxing Council champions
Road incident deaths in Mexico
People from Santiago Tianguistenco